Hulsea is a small genus of North American flowering plants in the family Asteraceae known commonly as alpinegold.

Alpinegolds are annual or perennial herbs native to western North America. They produce stout erect stems which may be fuzzy, hairy, or quite woolly. They are leafy, especially toward the base of the stem. At the top of the stem they bear small daisylike flower heads, with ray florets in shades of yellow to reddish-orange around a center packed with disc florets. The fruits are generally hard and black with a pappus.

Species
 Hulsea algida - Pacific hulsea - California, Nevada, Oregon, Idaho, Wyoming, Montana
 Hulsea brevifolia - shortleaf alpinegold - California
 Hulsea californica - San Diego alpinegold, San Diego sunflower - Baja California, California (San Diego County, Riverside County)
 Hulsea heterochroma - redray alpinegold - California, Nevada, Utah, Arizona
 Hulsea mexicana - Mexican alpinegold - Baja California, San Diego County in California
 Hulsea nana - dwarf alpinegold - northern California, Oregon, Washington
 Hulsea vestita - pumice alpinegold - California, Nye County in Nevada

References

External links
 United States Department of Agriculture Plants Profile
 Jepson Manual Treatment, University of California

 
Asteraceae genera
Flora of North America